The 28th Canadian Film Awards were held on November 20, 1977 to honour achievements in Canadian film. The ceremony was hosted by Gordon Pinsent.

For this year's awards, 143 films were submitted for consideration, including 11 feature films, 78 documentaries and 23 TV dramas. Also, the organizing committee announced a new selection process; films would now be assessed through secret ballot. This eliminated the traditional selection practices using the nominating pre-selection committee and the international jury for the final selection. Now, a new jury group composed of one representative from each committee member organization, chose four nominees in each category from a first ballot, then selected the winners from that group.

Films

Feature Film Craft Awards

Non-Feature Craft Awards
{| class=wikitable width="100%"
|-
! style="background:#EEDD82; width:50%" | Performance by a Lead Actor
! style="background:#EEDD82; width:50%" | Performance by a Lead Actress
|-
| valign="top" |
 George Clutesi - Dreamspeaker (CBC)
| valign="top" |
 Marina Dimakopoulos - Happiness Is Loving Your Teacher (NFB)
|-
! style="background:#EEDD82; width:50%" | Supporting Actor or Actress
! style="background:#EEDD82; width:50%" | Art Direction
|-
| valign="top" |
 Jacques Hubert - Dreamspeaker (CBC)
| valign="top" |
 Evelyn Roth - Woven in Time|-
! style="background:#EEDD82; width:50%" | Cinematography
! style="background:#EEDD82; width:50%" | Best Direction
|-
| valign="top" |
 Tamara Sale, Dave Geddes, Ron Orieux and Jeff Mart - Spartree  (Mercury Pictures)
| valign="top" |
 Claude Jutra - Dreamspeaker (CBC)
|-
! style="background:#EEDD82; width:50%" | Film Editing
! style="background:#EEDD82; width:50%" | Sound Editing
|-
| valign="top" |
 Mary Gross - Potters at Work (Marty Gross Film Productions)
| valign="top" |
 Raymond Hall - Spartree  (Mercury Pictures)
|-
! style="background:#EEDD82; width:50%" | Screenplay
! style="background:#EEDD82; width:50%" | Non-Dramatic Script
|-  
| valign="top" |
 Cam Hubert - Dreamspeaker (CBC) 
| valign="top" |
 Donald Brittain - Henry Ford's America (NFB)
|-
! style="background:#EEDD82; width:50%" | Sound Recording
! style="background:#EEDD82; width:50%" | Sound Re-recording
|-
| valign="top" |
 Fred Easton, Chris Aikenhead and Michael Chechik - Greenpeace: Voyage to Save the Whales (Omnifilm Entertainment)
| valign="top" |
 Barry Jones - Spartree  (Mercury Pictures)
|-
! style="background:#EEDD82; width:50%" | Music Score
! style="background:#EEDD82; width:50%" | 
|-
| valign="top" |
 Jean Cousineau - Dreamspeaker (CBC) 
|}

Special AwardsRalph L. Thomas: "for increasing the stature of film drama on television in Canada".
Wendy Michener Award: Zale Dalen - "for outstanding artistic achievement in Skip Tracer".
Golden Reel Award: Lawrence Hertzog - Why Shoot the Teacher? - "for highest-grossing film".
John Grierson Award: Fernand Dansereau''' - "for outstanding contributions to Canadian cinema".

References

Canadian
1977 in Canadian cinema
Canadian Film Awards (1949–1978)